Aftab District is in Tehran County, Tehran province, Iran. At the 2006 National Census, its population was 22,898 in 5,497 households. The following census in 2011 counted 28,402 people in 7,811 households. At the latest census in 2016, the district had 32,630 inhabitants in 9,537 households.

References 

Tehran County

Districts of Tehran Province

Populated places in Tehran Province

Populated places in Tehran County